John Thomas McGrath (23 August 1938 – 25 December 1998) was an English footballer and manager in the Football League.

He played as a defender, and started his career at Bury from 1955 to 1960. He then spent the next eight years with Newcastle United following a £24,000 transfer, helping them to the Second Division title in 1964–65. In 1968, he joined Southampton for a £30,000 fee, where he would spend the final six years of his playing career, although he also played briefly for Brighton & Hove Albion in 1973. In total he played 537 league and cup games in a nineteen-year career in the Football League, scoring six goals.

Starting his management career at Port Vale in 1979, he won them promotion out of the Fourth Division in 1982–83. Following this he left to take the reins at Chester City in 1984. Appointed manager at Preston North End in 1986, he led them promotion out of the Fourth Division as runners-up in 1986–87, before departing in 1990. He finished his career with a brief spell in charge of Halifax Town in 1992.

Playing career

Bury
McGrath started out as an amateur player with local team Miles Platting Swifts and then Bolton Wanderers, but it was with Bury that he began his professional career in October 1955. The "Shakers" posted a 15h place finish in the Second Division under the management of Dave Russell in 1955–56. However they suffered relegation after finishing 21st in 1956–57, five points below Notts County. Bury then finished fourth in the Third Division North in 1957–58, ten points behind champions Scunthorpe & Lindsey United. They became founder members of the Third Division in 1958–59, posting a tenth-place finish. They moved up to seventh in 1959–60, eight points behind promoted Norwich City. In his five years at Gigg Lane he made 148 league appearances, scoring two goals. He also played one game for the England under-23 team, playing alongside Bobby Moore and George Cohen against West Germany at White Hart Lane.

Newcastle United
In February 1961, McGrath found himself the subject of a bid by Newcastle United, and he left for St James' Park for a £24,000 fee. The "Magpies" suffered relegation out of the First Division in 1960–61 under Charlie Mitten, conceding 109 goals. However, because of his no nonsense attitude and uncompromising style as a defender, McGrath soon became a real favourite with the "Toon Army" after new manager Joe Harvey "got him more aggressive". A disappointing eleventh-place finish in the Second Division followed in 1961–62, and Joe Harvey took over from Norman Smith in the management hotseat. Seventh and eighth-place finishes followed in 1962–63 and 1963–64, before McGrath was an ever-present as United were crowned champions of the Second Division in 1964–65, a single point ahead of second placed Northampton Town. They settled into the top-flight with a 15th-place finish in 1965–66, though they only avoided relegation by one place and four points in 1966–67. They then rallied to a tenth-place finish in 1967–68. However he lost his place in the first-team to John McNamee and a young Bobby Moncur, with Graham Winstanley proving an able deputy. Overall, McGrath played 179 league and cup games for the Geordies, scoring two goals, before making the long trip to Southampton in February 1968 for £30,000.

Southampton 
Under Ted Bates's stewardship, the "Saints" finished seventh in the top-flight in 1968–69. They dropped to 19th in 1969–70, two places and three points ahead of relegated Sunderland. During a match against Liverpool in September 1970, McGrath collided with Alun Evans in mid-air and was accused by manager Bill Shankly of playing "alehouse football". They then shot up to seventh in 1970–71, qualifying for UEFA Cup football. Southampton then dropped again to 19th in 1971–72, two places and six points above relegated Nottingham Forest. They rose to 13th in 1972–73, but occupied the newly created 20th place relegation place in 1973–74, one point behind the safety of Birmingham City. He lost his first-team place to Paul Bennett. In December 1973, joined Brighton & Hove Albion on loan, after manager Pat Saward struggled to find a reliable centre-back partner for Norman Gall following an injury to Ian Goodwin. He played three games for the "Seagulls", all of which ended in defeat, with a total of eight goals conceded. McGrath remained somewhat of a cult hero with The Dell faithful during what was a difficult time for the club, as he also made his mark as a very shrewd coach. He played a total of 195 games for Southampton in all competitions.

Style of play
Throughout his playing career, McGrath evolved from a "gentle" and "cultured" player into a tough, uncompromising and aggressive centre-half. McGrath was said to be "very one-pace; very one-dimensional" by Southampton teammate Terry Paine. He rarely scored goals as his role in the opposition penalty box during corner was that of a "disrupter". His obituary in The Independent described how his "lurid public persona was something between Desperate Dan and Attila the Hun".

Coaching and management

Southampton
After retiring from playing in September 1973, McGrath immediately joined the Southampton coaching staff, He was appointed youth team coach, and was part of the coaching staff at Wembley when Southampton won the FA Cup in May 1976. In September 1978, he was appointed reserve team manager.

Port Vale
He got his break in management when he was appointed Port Vale manager in December 1979. A man of discipline, within his first fortnight with the club he had levied two fines. He demanded dedication and effort from his players and managed to steady the ship at Vale Park following brief and unsuccessful reigns from rookie managers Dennis Butler and Alan Bloor, stating that "the holiday is over". The "Valiants" had flat-lined, and finished fifth-from-bottom in the Fourth Division in 1979–80, outside of the re-election zone on goals scored. He appointed John Rudge as his assistant on a recommendation. McGrath offloaded many under-performing players, transfer-listing fifteen of them, and signed goalkeeper Mark Harrison and defender Lee Harwood from Southampton.

McGrath spent the 1980–81 season attempting to whip his charges into shape, whilst Vale fans patiently awaited the true results of a manager they quickly built faith in. The only new signings he could afford to make were free signings John Allen from Leicester City and Trevor Brissett from Stoke City. Vale exited the FA Cup at the Third Round following a humiliating 3–0 defeat to non-league side Enfield. They initially struggled away from home, but built their league campaign on results at Vale Park. During the season, he handed Mark Chamberlain (brother of top-scorer Neville) his debut, and brought talented winger Johnny Miller to Burslem. He sold goalkeeper Trevor Dance to non-league Stafford Rangers for £10,000, as Harrison was in good form. At the way mid-way stage he brought in midfielder Terry Armstrong and big defender Andy Higgins. He solved the team's poor away form by installing a five-man defence.

He built for the 1981–82 season by signing defender Ray Deakin from Everton; midfielder Geoff Hunter from Crewe Alexandra for £12,000; and forwards Ernie Moss from Chesterfield for £12,000 and Jimmy Greenhoff from the Toronto Blizzard. They lost just one of their opening eight games, before their form suffered due to an injury crisis. In mid-season Vale went fifteen games unbeaten, before another bought of injuries caused their promotion campaign to wither into a seventh-place finish. Having drawn 12 home games, McGrath said "we blew it at Burslem". He did though manage to blood young striker Mark Bright and the following season handed Robbie Earle his debut, both of whom would become top-flight footballers.

Promotion was eventually achieved with a third-place finish in 1982–83. This was despite McGrath selling Mark Chamberlain and Mark Harrison to Stoke for £100,000. He made five free signings: John Ridley (a former Valiant), Wayne Cegielski (Wrexham), Les Lawrence (Torquay United), Steve Waddington (Walsall), and Barry Siddall (Sunderland). He further sold Neville Chamberlain to Stoke for £40,000, bringing in burly striker Bob Newton from Hartlepool United for £15,000. Vale went top of the table despite a goalkeeping crisis which saw Barry Siddall, Neville Southall, Neil McAdam, and Andy Poole between the sticks at different points in the campaign. He bought striker Jim Steel from Oldham Athletic for £10,000, whilst letting Ernie Moss go to Lincoln City for a £1,500 fee after judging him to be too old to be of any further use. With 34 goals conceded, Vale had the best defensive record in the Football League.

The following season, however, McGrath was in conflict with chairman Jim Lloyd, who instructed him to speak to the press only on team matters; numerous players also were disgruntled over contract issues. By December 1983, Vale were three points adrift at the foot of the Third Division and McGrath was sacked. McGrath had made some poor choices during his final months at the club, signing Ireland international striker Eamonn O'Keefe from Wigan Athletic for £10,000 only to play him in midfield, and allowing player unrest to fester as several rejected new contracts and four stayed at the club on weekly contracts – this was despite Vale paying the third-highest wage bill in the division (£9,000 a week). He also offloaded top-scorer Bob Newton to Chesterfield in exchange for Martin Henderson, who was not a success. McGrath retained the support of the fans however, who criticised the board for their decision to sack him. His assistant, John Rudge, was appointed as manager and failed to avoid relegation, though would take the club to great success in a sixteen-year spell at the club.

During his time at Vale Park he made some unorthodox decisions; such as putting fifteen players on the transfer list at once, taking the team for a swim at Blackpool, and one time sending assistant manager John Rudge hundreds of miles on a scouting mission, only to rip up the report in the dressing room, declaring to his players that 'It's not about them, it's about us!'

Chester City
He became manager of Chester City in January 1984, who were struggling at the foot of the Fourth Division, but some improved results (including a derby win over Wrexham) gave cause for optimism for the following season. McGrath added experience in players such as John Butcher, Steve Fox, Mick Speight and Nigel Walker but Chester continued to struggle at the wrong end of the table. He lost his job in December 1984, after a 5–1 loss to Stockport County. Although results were not always impressive, McGrath began to mould the side that would to go on to win promotion in 1985–86 after further strengthening by Mick Speight and Harry McNally. McGrath gave future England international Lee Dixon his first taste of regular first-team football when at Chester.

Preston North End
In 1986, Preston North End came calling. The once proud club was on its knees and after ending the 1985–86 season in 91st position (in the Football League) they needed some new blood and new ideas. McGrath was just the man for the job, although he was not the board's not first choice, with Preston courting the services of Tranmere manager Johnny King and his successor at Port Vale John Rudge, before settling on McGrath. Striker Gary Brazil compared him to a tasmanian devil for the rapid changes he instigated at Deepdale.

He signed Sam Allardyce as his centre-half, building the defence around him. Up front he had the veteran striker Frank Worthington. With the newly laid plastic pitch already installed McGrath assembled a squad of free transfer old pros, lower league journeymen and young cast-offs to fire the team to promotion in his first season. He was seen as a hero and after four years of relative success McGrath departed in February 1990 leaving Preston in a far healthier position that when he'd found them.

Halifax Town
His final spell in management began on 3 October 1991, when he succeeded Jim McCalliog as manager of Fourth Division strugglers Halifax Town. He lasted just over a year at The Shay before departing on 7 December 1992, five months before Halifax finished bottom of the Football League and were relegated to the Conference.

Personal and later life
He married Ann. McGrath became a very popular after-dinner speaker, but on Christmas Day 1998 he died suddenly at his Manchester home at the age of 60.

Career statistics

Playing statistics
Source:

A.  The "Other" column constitutes appearances and goals in the League Cup, Football League Trophy, Football League play-offs and Full Members Cup.

Managerial statistics

Honours

As a player
Newcastle United
Football League Second Division: 1964–65

As a manager
Port Vale
Football League Fourth Division third-place promotion: 1982–83

Preston North End
Football League Fourth Division second-place promotion: 1986–87

References

1938 births
1998 deaths
Footballers from Manchester
English footballers
England under-23 international footballers
Association football defenders
Bolton Wanderers F.C. players
Bury F.C. players
Newcastle United F.C. players
Southampton F.C. players
Brighton & Hove Albion F.C. players
English Football League players
English football managers
Port Vale F.C. managers
Chester City F.C. managers
Preston North End F.C. managers
Halifax Town A.F.C. managers
English Football League managers
English Football League representative players
Association football coaches
Southampton F.C. non-playing staff